Valode & Pistre (Valode et Pistre) is a French architecture firm founded by Denis Valode and Jean Pistre. It has its head office in the 7th arrondissement of Paris, with branches operating  for over ten years in Moscow and Beijing, .

Based in Paris the firm works on projects both in France and across the globe in Europe, Russia, the Middle East, Asia, North and Sub-Saharan Africa, and Central America. Valode & Pistre’s practice focuses on very diverse scales, from developing comprehensive plans for brand new cities to designing furniture. It also includes very diverse briefs. In all of the sectors in which the firm works, its architects endeavor to transfer the contributions and innovations from one field to the other to offer renewed and novel, in-depth reflections going beyond the projects themselves. To accomplish this, the firm digs to the core of pluralistic questions, as much from sociological and scientific points of view as ecological, ethical, aesthetic, and cultural ones. This drive to be “ at the intersection of everything ”— a fertile ground of variable geometry— feeds a sort of mental gymnastics that embodies the creative process. “ What interests us is creating buildings that could not have been conceived in another location. The architectural gesture therefore has meaning and is rooted in something. ”

Projects

 T1 Tower
 Tour Generali
 Air France head office
 Air France Cité PN
 Bouygues head office
 Centre commercial Beaugrenelle
 Shenzhen World Exhibition Center, world largest convention center
 Tour Saint-Gobain

References

External links

 Valode & Pistre 
 Valode & Pistre 

Architecture firms of France
Companies based in Paris